Nehale Senior Secondary School is a public school in Onayena, Oshikoto Region, Namibia. Established in 1976, it is among the oldest secondary schools in the region. Nehale SSS is named after Nehale Mpingana, king of the Ondonga. The school is located at Onayena, approximately 20 kilometres east of Ondangwa.

It has a history of exceptional performance with the highest pass rate in the region and the second best preferred school in the region after Oshigambo High School.
Nehale Secondary School is also a cluster centre to the schools in Onayena. It is part of Onathinge education cluster.

Current State
The school was established during the colonial era and has not seen major renovations since then. The school obtains most of its funding from the government. This is generally not sufficient to cover running school expenses. Its facilities are thus dilapidated. A broken sewerage system, lack of accommodation for teachers, inadequate laboratory facilities and the lack of a hall are the major challenges.

In 2020, the school was hard hit by the COVID-19 pandemic in Namibia leading to an  indefinitely suspension of teaching and learning at the School by the directorate of education as over 170 confirmed cases of COVID-19 have been reported.

Notable alumni
The following people have attended or taught at Nehale Senior Secondary:
 Peya Mushelenga, Cabinet Minister of the Republic of Namibia
 Johannes Nakwafila, Namibian politician who served as SWAPO Party Councillor for Epembe Constituency 
 Tunakie, Namibian multiple award-winning musician

List of schools in Nehale Cluster
 Uuyoka Combined School
 Oniihwa Combined School
 Onayena Junior Secondary School
 Oniiwe Primary School
 Onayena Primary School
 Joseph Simaneka Asino Secondary school
 Matheus Nashandi Combined School

References

Schools in Oshikoto Region
Educational institutions established in 1976
Boarding schools in Namibia
1976 establishments in South West Africa